Inurois is a genus of moths in the family Geometridae first described by Arthur Gardiner Butler in 1879.

Species
 Inurois brumneus Viidalepp, 1986
 Inurois fletcheri Inoue, 1954
 Inurois fumosa Inoue, 1944
 Inurois membranaria (Christoph, 1881)
 Inurois tenuis Butler, 1879
 Inurois ussuriensis Viidalepp, 1986

References

Alsophilinae
Geometridae genera